The New Adventures of Beans Baxter is an adventure/comedy television series that aired 1987 on the Fox television network. It was created by Savage Steve Holland, who also wrote and directed most of the 17 episodes. The title character was portrayed by Jonathan Ward, who won a "Best Young Actor Starring in a New Television Comedy Series" Young Artist Award for the role.

Plot
The show revolved around the spy activities of Benjamin "Beans" Baxter, Jr., a Kansas teenager who had just moved with his parents and younger brother to Washington, D.C., as part of his father's (assumed) reassignment as an employee of the U.S. Postal Service.

After Beans witnessed his father's apparent assassination in the explosion of a bomb planted in Benjamin Sr.'s postal freighter, he was recruited by the mysterious "Number Two" (Jerry Wasserman). Number Two was an officer (and, presumably, the Deputy Director) of "the Network", a CIA-styled spy agency; Beans thus learned that his father was actually an agent of the Network, and that the older Baxter's Postal Service employment was his cover assignment. (The Network's main delivery of assignments for its agents was a system similar to what was seen on the spy comedy Get Smart! in the 1960s.) The main nemesis of the Network was a terror organization that called itself UGLI, for the Underground Government Liberation Intergroup, which was headed by the professional terrorist called Mr. Sue (Kurtwood Smith) and his second-in-command (Taylor Negron). The Network, however, considered Beans himself strictly a "place-holder" agent, and it would only allow him to work in its dangerous service till his father could be found and freed. Viewers were warned, as a result, to expect to see little of Benjamin Sr., since his prime purpose was to stay lost and trapped so the series might continue.

Additional episodes were intended to show Beans's mother Susan, wrongly believing herself to be a widow, re-entering the dating scene. This activity on her part was to have led to complications for Beans, who knew, as she did not, that hers was still a valid, legal marriage to a husband who was still alive, and would thus have had to turn away possible suitors to prevent his mother from accidentally committing bigamy. Moreover, for all Beans or Susan knew, any of those suitors might have been UGLI terrorists planning all manner of nefarious activities, such as possibly assassinating not only Susan, but also Beans. The series was cancelled before any of these developments could be explored.

Beans started a friendship with a classmate nicknamed Woodshop (Stuart Fratkin), and he later became attracted to a beautiful student nicknamed "Cake Lace" (Karen Mistal). In one episode, former Miss Universe Shawn Weatherly appeared as herself. (The opening scene had Beans catching her in the shower naked and trying to escape from UGLI's chief henchman, who wanted to kidnap her as part of an unknown experiment.)

Cast

The supporting cast included Rick Lenz as Beans's father, Benjamin Sr.; former 1950s' child star Elinor Donahue from Father Knows Best as his mother, Susan; Canadian teen actor Scott Bremner as Scott "Scooter" Baxter, Beans's younger brother; and occasional guest appearances by punk rock icon Wendy O. Williams (founder/lead singer of the Plasmatics) as Beans' part-time friend/enemy in the spy world.

The role was originally offered to David Spade, and he regretted turning it down per advice of his agents.

1x01/02 - Derek Shane (Lars), Bruce Wagner (Vlodia), Betty Philips (Mrs. Kindwater), Stephen E. Miller (Colonel), Douglas Tuck (Mr. Lucas), Tara Vessels (Newscaster)

1x03 - Kristin Cumming (Darla), David Longworth (UGLI Two)

Episodes

Season 1 (1987)

Season 2 (1987)

Production
The series was filmed entirely in and around Vancouver, British Columbia; in the episode "Beans Gets His Driver's License (And It Isn't Pretty)", the world-famous CN Tower located in Toronto is featured in the background. The show's theme and soundtrack were performed by jazz trumpeter Maynard Ferguson.

References

External links
 

1980s American teen sitcoms
1987 American television series debuts
1987 American television series endings
American adventure television series
Fox Broadcasting Company original programming
Television shows set in Washington, D.C.
Espionage television series
Television series by 20th Century Fox Television
Television series created by Savage Steve Holland
Television series about teenagers